James Lockhart may refer to:
James Lockhart (Scottish aristocrat) (1727–1790), Scottish aristocrat and military figure
James Lockhart (banker) (1763–1852), English amateur mathematician
James Lockhart (Indiana politician) (1806–1857), American politician 
James A. Lockhart (1850–1905), United States Representative from North Carolina
J. B. Lockhart (1886–1969), Scottish mathematician
James B. Lockhart III (born 1946), director of the US Federal Housing Finance Agency (FHFA)
James Stewart Lockhart (1858–1937), British colonial administrator in Hong Kong and China
James Lockhart (music director) (born 1930), Scottish conductor
James Lockhart (historian) (1933–2014), academic and historian specializing in early Latin America and Nahuatl sources
James Bruce Lockhart (1941–2018), British diplomat, intelligence officer, author, and artist
James Lockhart (Oklahoma politician) Former member of the Oklahoma House of Representatives